Tuomas Kiiskinen (born October 7, 1986) is a Finnish professional ice hockey player who is currently playing for Skellefteå AIK of the Swedish Hockey League (SHL). He recently played for the Växjö Lakers of the SHL. In 2015, Kiiskinen scored the goal that won Växjö the Le Mat Trophy in the second overtime against Skellefteå AIK.

Awards and honors

References

External links

1986 births
Living people
HC Donbass players
KalPa players
Växjö Lakers players
Finnish ice hockey forwards
People from Kuopio
Sportspeople from North Savo